Ferenc Donáth (born 28 June 1954) is a retired Hungarian gymnast. He competed at the 1976 and 1980 Summer Olympics in all artistic gymnastics events and finished in fourth and third place with the Hungarian team, respectively. Individually his best achievement was a fourth place in the rings in 1976. During his long gymnastics career Donáth took part in five world championships (1974–1983).

References

1955 births
Living people
Hungarian male artistic gymnasts
Gymnasts at the 1976 Summer Olympics
Gymnasts at the 1980 Summer Olympics
Olympic gymnasts of Hungary
Olympic bronze medalists for Hungary
Olympic medalists in gymnastics
Medalists at the 1980 Summer Olympics
People from Nagykőrös
Sportspeople from Pest County
20th-century Hungarian people